Wentzville is an exurb of St. Louis that is located in western St. Charles County, Missouri, United States. As of the 2020 census, the city had a total population of 44,372, making it the 15th largest city in Missouri. Wentzville has been the fastest growing city in Missouri, by percentage population increase, for two consecutive decades from 2000 to 2020. As the site of the Rotary Park, Wentzville is host to the St. Charles County Fair and the St. Louis Renaissance Festival.

History
Wentzville was laid out in 1855. The community has the name of the chief engineer of the Northern Missouri Railroad Erasmus Livingston Wentz. A post office called Wentzville has been in operation since 1859.

The Wentzville Tobacco Company Factory was listed on the National Register of Historic Places in 1990.

Wentzville is the location of the first Vietnam Veterans Memorial in the United States. It began as a tree of lights to help raise money in 1967 to send gifts to active servicemen, but later evolved by 1984 to a carved eagle atop a pillar of granite. It has become a regular stop in the national "Run for the Wall" trip for veterans.

One of the 13 U.S. service members killed in the 2021 Kabul airport attack was from Wentzville.

Geography
Wentzville is located at 38°48'58" North, 90°51'26" West (38.816010, −90.857198).

Demographics

2010 census
As of the census of 2010, there were 29,070 people, 9,767 households, and 7,852 families living in the city. The racial makeup of the city was 89.9% White, 6.0% African American, 0.3% Native American, 1.2% Asian, 0.8% from other races, and 1.9% from two or more races. Hispanic or Latino of any race were 2.7% of the population.

There were 9,767 households, of which 51.5% had children under the age of 18 living with them, 65.3% were married couples living together, 11.1% had a female householder with no husband present, 4.0% had a male householder with no wife present, and 19.6% were non-families. 15.6% of all households were made up of individuals, and 5% had someone living alone who was 65 years of age or older. The average household size was 2.96 and the average family size was 3.31.

The median age in the city was 31.2 years. 33.7% of residents were under the age of 18; 6.2% were between the ages of 18 and 24; 33.7% were from 25 to 44; 19% were from 45 to 64; and 7.5% were 65 years of age or older. The gender makeup of the city was 48.5% male and 51.5% female.

2000 census
As of the census of 2000, there were 13,931 people, 2,456 households, and 1,846 families living in the city. The racial makeup of the city was 84.63% White, 12.02% African American, 0.16% Native American, 0.55% Asian, 0.06% Pacific Islander, 0.52% from other races, 2.06% from two or more races. 1.49% of the population were Hispanic or Latino of any race.

There were 2,456 households, out of which 43.5% had children under the age of 18 living with them, 54.5% were married couples living together, 17.1% had a female householder with no husband present, and 24.8% were non-families. 20.7% of all households were made up of individuals, and 9.1% had someone living alone who was 65 years of age or older. The average household size was 2.76 and the average family size was 3.20.

In the city, the population was spread out, with 31.8% under the age of 18, 9.2% from 18 to 24, 30.7% from 25 to 44, 17.4% from 45 to 64, and 10.8% who were 65 years of age or older. The median age was 31 years. For every 100 females, there were 87.6 males. For every 100 females age 18 and over, there were 82.5 males.

The median income for a household in the city was $47,232, and the median income for a family was $53,082. Males had a median income of $38,423 versus $25,852 for females. The per capita income for the city was $18,039. 11.6% of the population and 10.1% of families were below the poverty line. Out of the total population, 19.1% of those under the age of 18 and 13.3% of those 65 and older were living below the poverty line.

Government
The government of Wentzville consists of a mayor, six aldermen (two for each ward), and a city administrator. City Administrator is a non-elected position, whereas the others are elected. Mayors serve four-year terms and aldermen serve two-year terms. The city is divided into three wards.

Economy
The city's major employer is General Motors which has a full size van and small truck assembly plant located there, called Wentzville Assembly.

One of the city's largest employers, from 2013 to 2017, was Serco. The British-based company was awarded a five-year contract in 2013 to manage the implementation of the Affordable Care Act. As a result of the contract, Serco opened its Affordable Care Act application processing facility in Wentzville in August of that same year in the building that was formerly home to the US Fidelis call center. The Wentzville Serco facility attracted national attention in 2014 after whistle-blower allegations revealed that workers spent large amounts of time sleeping or playing games due to lack of work.
At its peak, Serco employed approximately 1,500 employees in Wentzville. In 2018, Serco announced its closure of the Wentzville processing center to coincide with the end of its five-year contract with the Centers for Medicaid and Medicare Services. Closing of the facility resulted in a loss of 850 jobs.

Top employers
According to Wentzville's 2020 Popular Annual Financial Report, the top employers in the city were:

Education

The Wentzville R-IV School District covers Wentzville, Lake St. Louis, Foristell, Dardenne Prairie and parts of O'Fallon. There are four public high schools in the Wentzville District: Wentzville Holt High School, Timberland High School, North Point High School, and Liberty High School. Liberty High School is in neighboring Lake St. Louis.

Catholic schools in Wentzville include St. Patrick School which hosts preschool through eighth grade. Immanuel Lutheran School is a private Christian school off Highway N. Immanuel offers classes for children from preschool through 8th Grade. It is a Lutheran Exemplary status school.

Lindenwood University has a satellite campus located in the building that was formerly home to the Southern Air Restaurant, which after many years as a popular stop for travelers between St. Louis and Columbia, Missouri was last owned by Chuck Berry.

Midwest University, a primarily Korean-American, Christian institution offers undergraduate and graduate degrees in Wentzville.

Urshan College and Urshan Graduate School of Theology, educational institutions owned and operated by the United Pentecostal Church International, offer undergraduate and graduate degrees in Wentzville.

Wentzville has a public library, a branch of the St. Charles City-County Library.

"In God We Trust" insignia controversy

Sally Hunt of Maryland Heights spoke to the Wentzville Board of Aldermen on February 28, 2018, regarding an "In God We Trust" insignia recently mounted on the dais. Hunt was prevented from using all her allotted five minutes to speak to the council and then was forcibly removed from the room by police claiming they were acting on order of the mayor. The ACLU sued Wentzville in April 2018 on behalf of Hunt which was settled in November 2018. City of Wentzville insurance will pay $2,670 to the ACLU to offset lawyers' fees and legal cost. According to the terms of the settlement, Wentzville law enforcement officers will not remove a person from a council meeting without probable cause. Wentzville agreed not to censor speech due to content in future open forums.

Notable people

 Dan Alexander – former American football fullback and linebacker 
 Ellene Alice Bailey – 19th-century American designer and inventor
 Montee Ball – former American football running back for the Denver Broncos
 Chuck Berry – pioneering rock and roll singer, songwriter and guitarist; member of the initial class inducted into the Rock and Roll Hall of Fame
 Ross Detwiler – Major League Baseball pitcher (Nationals, Braves, Rangers, and Indians)
 Ron Hunt – former Major League Baseball player
 Tim Melville – Major League Baseball pitcher (Reds, Twins, Padres, and Rockies)
 Nathan Orf – baseball player for the Milwaukee Brewers
 Emil John Raddatz – Prussian immigrant who became a miner, politician, and businessman
 Justin Skaggs – former American football player
 Bryan Spencer – former member of the Missouri House of Representatives
 Kyle Weatherman – NASCAR driver

References

External links

 Wentzville, Missouri
 Historic maps of Wentzville in the Sanborn Maps of Missouri Collection at the University of Missouri

Cities in St. Charles County, Missouri
Cities in Missouri
1855 establishments in Missouri